John Inscho Mitchell (July 28, 1838August 20, 1907) was an American lawyer, jurist, and Republican party politician from Tioga County, Pennsylvania. He served in the state legislature and represented Pennsylvania in both the U.S. House and Senate. He was later a judge in several state courts.

Biography

John Inscho Mitchell was born in Tioga Township, Tioga County, Pennsylvania on July 28, 1838. He attended common school in addition to receiving private instruction. Mitchell later received his college education at the University of Lewisburg, modern-day Bucknell University.

After graduating from college in 1859, Mitchell taught school until 1861, when he joined the Union Army. He served in the Civil War as a lieutenant and captain in the 166th Regiment of the Pennsylvania Volunteer Infantry. Mitchell subsequently pursued an education in law and was admitted to the bar in 1864. He served as District Attorney of Tioga County from 1868 to 1871. He ran for, was elected to and served in the Pennsylvania State House of Representatives between 1872 and 1876 until his election to the United States House of Representatives, where he served from 1877 to 1881. In 1881, Mitchell was elected to the United States Senate. He served there for one six-year term and was chairman of the Committee on the Mississippi River and Its Tributaries and Committee on Pensions.

After the conclusion of his congressional career, Mitchell served as judge of the court of common pleas of Pennsylvania's fourth district from 1888 to 1899. He subsequently served for one session as judge of the Superior Court of Pennsylvania.

Mitchell died in Wellsboro, Pennsylvania on August 20, 1907, and was interred in Wellsboro Cemetery.

External links

1838 births
1907 deaths
19th-century American judges
19th-century American politicians
County district attorneys in Pennsylvania
Judges of the Pennsylvania Courts of Common Pleas
Republican Party members of the Pennsylvania House of Representatives
People from Tioga County, Pennsylvania
Republican Party members of the United States House of Representatives from Pennsylvania
Republican Party United States senators from Pennsylvania